Kurmukar is a Bengali-Assamese language of India.

References

Eastern Indo-Aryan languages